The 1932 Missouri Tigers football team was an American football team that represented the University of Missouri in the Big Six Conference (Big 6) during the 1932 college football season. The team compiled a 1–7–1 record (1–3–1 against Big 6 opponents), finished in fifth place in the Big 6, and was outscored by all opponents by a combined total of 184 to 32. Frank Carideo was the head coach for the first of three seasons. The team played its home games at Memorial Stadium in Columbia, Missouri.

The team's leading scorer was Charles Schiele with 12 points.

Schedule

References

Missouri
Missouri Tigers football seasons
Missouri Tigers football